Miroslav Opsenica (Serbian Cyrillic: Мирослав Опсеница; 2 November 1981 – 25 May 2011) was a Serbian footballer.

Opsenica was born in Gospić. He played for the Serbian clubs FK Mladost Apatin, FK Vojvodina, FK Radnički Sombor and FK Novi Sad, and the Polish club ŁKS Łódź. He died in a car accident on 25 May 2011, aged 29.

External links
 Profile and stats at Srbijafudbal
 

1981 births
2011 deaths
Sportspeople from Gospić
Serbs of Croatia
Serbian footballers
Serbian expatriate footballers
FK Mladost Apatin players
FK Vojvodina players
Serbian SuperLiga players
ŁKS Łódź players
Expatriate footballers in Poland
RFK Novi Sad 1921 players
FK Kolubara players
Association football midfielders
Serbian expatriate sportspeople in Poland
Place of death missing
Road incident deaths in Serbia